William Robert Crissy, Jr. (born February 3, 1959) is a former American football cornerback in the National Football League for the Washington Redskins.  He played college football at Princeton University and was drafted in the 12th round of the 1981 NFL Draft by the New England Patriots

Crissy played football for Penn Yan Academy, the public high school in the small town of Penn Yan (population 5,500) in the Finger Lakes Region of New York State where he grew up. In his senior year (1976), he was named a first-team All-American, and the New York State Small School Player of the Year.  His high school team was undefeated that year, and won the class B state championship. Anthony "Tony" Collins, the former All-Pro New England Patriot, was a high school classmate and teammate (Collins was also drafted by the Patriots in 1981).

At Princeton, Crissy was named first-team All-Ivy in 1978 and second-team All-Ivy in 1979 as a Running Back, and first-team All-Ivy as a Wide Receiver in 1980.  In 1980, he had set the school record for most receptions and most receiving yards by the team's eighth game.  He also lettered in Track from 1978 to 1981.

Crissy was released by the Patriots in the 1981 preseason, and signed later that season by the Washington Redskins. He was also a member of their 1982 Super Bowl championship team, although he was on injured reserve all season due to a fractured cheekbone.  His college teammate, Bob Holly, was also a reserve quarterback on that team.

References

1959 births
Living people
People from Penn Yan, New York
American football cornerbacks
Princeton Tigers football players
Washington Redskins players